Stayt is a surname. Notable people with the surname include:

Charlie Stayt (born 1962), British journalist
Tom Stayt (born 1986), British cricketer